Bank Alfalah Limited, formerly Habib Credit and Exchange Bank,  is a Pakistani retail bank which is a subsidiary of the Emirati company Abu Dhabi United Group.

It is one of the largest private Banks in Pakistan with a network of more than 850 branches in more than 200 cities across Pakistan with an international presence in Bangladesh, Afghanistan, Bahrain and UAE of 12 branches.

History 
The roots of the bank go back to the Bank of Credit and Commerce International (BCCI), which had three branches in Pakistan. These were taken over by State Bank of Pakistan to safeguard the consumer interests, under a new identity of Habib Credit and Exchange Bank (HCEB).

In 1997, the bank was privatized and taken over by Abu Dhabi Group and United Venture Holding of UAE and Pakistan respectively, with a new identity of 'Bank Alfalah Limited'. The management of the bank had implemented strategies and policies so the bank would become a major player in the market. With a partnership with the Abu Dhabi Group, the position of the bank became stronger which allowed the bank to invest more in technology to increase its range of products and services.

Bank Alfalah was incorporated on 21 June 1997, as a public limited company under the Companies Ordinance 1984. Its banking operations commenced on November 1, 1997. The bank is engaged in commercial banking and related services as defined in the Banking companies ordinance, 1962.

Launching 
Bank Alfalah Limited was launched on 21 June 1992 as a public limited company under the Companies Ordinance 1984(now replaced by the Companies Act, 2017). The bank commenced its operations on 1 November 1997. The bank introduced commercial banking and related services as defined in the Banking companies ordinance, 1962. The Bank is owned and operated by the Abu Dhabi Group (UAE) and United Venture Holding (Pakistan).

Services 
The Bank provides financial solutions to consumers, corporations, institutions and governments through a broad spectrum of products and services, including corporate and investment banking, consumer banking and credit, securities brokerage, commercial, SME, agri-finance, Islamic and asset financing.

FinCEN 
Bank Alfalah was named in FinCEN leak, published by Buzzfeed News and the International Consortium of Investigative Journalists (ICIJ). It had three suspicious transactions flagged for transactions close to 2.5 million dollars of 2 trillion dollars of suspicious payments made globally by banks in 170 different countries. The three transactions occurred between 2011-2012.

References

External links
 Official website of Bank Alfalah
 IFC Investment in Bank Alfalah

Banks of Pakistan
Companies based in Karachi
Companies listed on the Pakistan Stock Exchange
Banks established in 1997
Pakistani subsidiaries of foreign companies
Pakistan–United Arab Emirates relations
Formerly government-owned companies of Pakistan
1997 mergers and acquisitions
Bank of Credit and Commerce International